The William Jennings Bryan House, also known as Fairview, is a historic house museum on Sumner Street in Lincoln, Nebraska, United States.  Built in 1902–03, it is noteworthy as the home of politician William Jennings Bryan (1860-1925), and was declared a National Historic Landmark in 1963.  It is located on the Bryan Health hospital campus, and houses museum displays related to Bryan on the ground floor and the William Jennings Bryan Institute on the upper floors.

Description and history
The William Jennings Bryan House is located near the southeast corner of the Bryan Health campus, on the north side of Sumner Street opposite South 50th Street.  The house is a brick building,  stories in height, with a combination of Classical Revival and Queen Anne Victorian styling.  It has the varied rooflines typical of the latter style, including a two-story square turret at the right front corner, topped by a slightly bellcast pyramidal roof with flared edges.  Window sizes and shapes are also varied, with a small Palladian window in one gable section, and a larger one on the second level of the tower.

The house was built in 1902 to a design by Artemus A. Roberts, and is a high-quality example of what was at the time a popular style in Lincoln.  It was built for William Jennings Bryan, a Democratic Party politician then at the height of his influence.  He was three times an unsuccessful candidate for President of the United States (in 1896, 1900, and 1908), and gave the influential Cross of Gold speech to the 1896 Democratic Party Convention.

The house served Bryan as both a private and public space. He hosted numerous gatherings, including political rallies and other public events, and also hosted prominent political figures of the day. The hospital, now Bryan Health, has grown to surround the house on two sides, obscuring the "fair view" which Bryan named the property for. The hospital at first used the house as a dormitory for nurses in training. Although the building remains in the hospital's ownership, it was restored in 1961 to the period of Bryan's occupancy, and opened as a museum operated by the state historical society and the local Junior League.

The home was restored in 1994.  The upper two floors house the Wm. Jennings Bryan Institute, which consists of three centers: the Center for Bioethics, the Center for Advancing Nursing Practice and the Center for Quality.

See also
List of National Historic Landmarks in Nebraska
National Register of Historic Places listings in Lancaster County, Nebraska

References

External links

BryanLGH Health System: History - scroll to bottom for information about the Bryan Museum and visitation
 (Note: this house has a different address and does not have the same appearance as given by NHL Program)
 "William Jennings Bryan, Presidential Contender" from C-SPAN's The Contenders, broadcast from the William Jennings Bryan House

Biographical museums in Nebraska
Historic house museums in Nebraska
Houses completed in 1903
Houses on the National Register of Historic Places in Nebraska
Historic American Buildings Survey in Nebraska
Museums in Lincoln, Nebraska
National Historic Landmarks in Nebraska
Queen Anne architecture in Nebraska
William Jennings Bryan
Houses in Lancaster County, Nebraska
National Register of Historic Places in Lincoln, Nebraska